Clostridium perfringens alpha toxin is a toxin produced by the bacterium Clostridium perfringens (C. perfringens) and is responsible for gas gangrene and myonecrosis in infected tissues. The toxin also possesses hemolytic activity.

Clinical significance
This toxin has been shown to be the key virulence factor in infection with C. perfringens; the bacterium is unable to cause disease without this toxin. Further, vaccination against the alpha toxin toxoid protects mice against C. perfringens gas gangrene. As a result, knowledge about the function of this particular protein greatly aids understanding of myonecrosis.

Structure and homology
The alpha toxin has remarkable similarity to toxins produced by other bacteria as well as natural enzymes. There is significant homology with phospholipase C enzymes from Bacillus cereus, C. bifermentans, and Listeria monocytogenes. The C terminal domain shows similarity with non-bacterial enzymes such as pancreatic lipase, soybean lipoxygenase, and synaptotagmin I.

The alpha toxin is a zinc metallophospholipase, requiring zinc for activation. First, the toxin binds to a binding site on the cell surface. The C-terminal C2-like PLAT domain binds calcium and allows the toxin to bind to the phospholipid head-groups on the cell surface. The C-terminal domain enters the phospholipid bilayer. The N-terminal domain has phospholipase activity. This property allows hydrolysis of phospholipids such as phosphatidyl choline, mimicking endogenous phospholipase C. The hydrolysis of phosphatidyl choline produces diacylglycerol, which activates a variety of second messenger pathways. The end-result includes activation of arachidonic acid pathway and production of thromboxane A2, production of IL-8, platelet-activating factor, and several intercellular adhesion molecules. These actions combine to cause edema due to increased vascular permeability.

See also
 Clostridium perfringens beta toxin

References

Bacterial toxins
Peripheral membrane proteins
Clostridiaceae
Gas gangrene